Marco – Über Meere und Berge (Italian: Dagli Appennini alle Ande) is a 1990 German-Italian television serial. It is loosely based on one of the stories from the novel Heart (Cuore) by Edmondo De Amicis, i.e. the monthly tale (racconto mensile) From the Apennines to the Andes (Dagli Appennini alle Ande).

See also
List of German television series

External links
 

Italian children's television series
German children's television series
1991 German television series debuts
1990 Italian television series debuts
1991 German television series endings
1990 Italian television series endings
ZDF original programming
1990s Italian television series
Television shows set in Argentina
Television shows set in Italy
Films based on works by Edmondo De Amicis
Works based on Heart (novel)